David Moffat Johnson (April 30, 1902 – January 3, 1973) was a Canadian athlete and diplomat.

Early life
David Johnson was born in 1902 in Lachine, Quebec. He studied at McGill and after graduating with an arts degree in 1923, he became the first McGill athlete to earn a Rhodes scholarship to the University of Oxford in England.

Sportsman
Johnson was a star athlete at McGill University in Montreal, where he led the varsity track and field team to four consecutive championships in the 1920s.

He was also an Olympian, as Canada's top track runner at the Olympic Games of 1924 in Paris. He finished fourth in two events, including the 400-metre race that was won by Scotland's Eric Liddell. The race was immortalised in the film Chariots of Fire and was recorded in contemporary newsreel: Johnson's maple-leaf emblem standing out clearly on the inside lane. In October, 2007, he was posthumously inducted into the McGill Sports Hall of Fame.

Diplomat
David Johnson had a successful diplomatic career, being posted to: Ireland, Pakistan, New York, Vietnam and the USSR. In New York, Johnson was Canada's Ambassador and Permanent Representative to the United Nations (UN). In Vietnam, Johnson was the Canadian Commissioner and Permanent Representative for the International Control Commission (ICC).

Johnson was the Canadian Ambassador to the Soviet Union from 1956 to 1960. He resigned his position after an investigation forced him to admit his homosexuality.

Johnson died in 1973.

References

External links
 
 
 

1902 births
1973 deaths
Anglophone Quebec people
Athletes from Montreal
Athletes (track and field) at the 1924 Summer Olympics
Canadian male sprinters
Canadian Rhodes Scholars
Canadian LGBT sportspeople
McGill University alumni
Olympic track and field athletes of Canada
People from Lachine, Quebec
20th-century Canadian LGBT people